USS LST-559 was a United States Navy  in commission from 1944 to 1946.

Construction and commissioning
LST-559 was laid down on 14 February 1944 at Evansville, Indiana, by the Missouri Valley Bridge and Iron Company. She was launched on 18 April 1944, sponsored by Mrs. Carl J. Futter, and commissioned on 9 May 1944.

Service history
During World War II, LST-559 was assigned to the Pacific Theater of Operations.  She participated in the capture and occupation of the southern Palau Islands in September and October 1944.  She then took part in the Philippines campaign, participating in the Leyte landings in October and November 1944 and invasion of at Lingayen Gulf in January 1945. She then participated in the assault on and occupation of Okinawa Gunto in April 1945.

Following the war, LST-559 performed occupation duty in the Far East and service in China until mid-May 1946.

Decommissioning and disposal
LST-559 was decommissioned on 1 June 1946 at Naval Station Subic Bay on Luzon in the Philippines. She stricken from the Navy List on 19 June 1946. On 5 December 1947, she was sold to Bosey in the Philippines, where her hulk was sunk to extend the breakwater in Subic Bay.

Honors and awards
LST-559 earned four battle stars for her World War II service.

References

NavSource Online: Amphibious Photo Archive LST-559

 

LST-542-class tank landing ships
World War II amphibious warfare vessels of the United States
Ships built in Evansville, Indiana
1944 ships
Shipwrecks of the Philippines